Apple Film Production is one of the first and leading independent production companies in Poland. It was founded in 1990 by Dariusz Jablonski, a graduate of the directing department of Lodz Film School, assistant to Krzysztof Kieslowski on Dekalog, A Short Film About Love and A Short Film About Killing.

To date the company has produced many feature films with famous Polish directors like  Krzysztof Krauze ("Street Games"), Robert Glinski ("Benek"), Filip Bajon ("The Spring to Come"), Władysław Pasikowski ("The Cop"), Malgorzata Szumowska, Andrzej Jakimowski, Krzysztof Zanussi ("Solidarity, Solidarity...") as well as with debutants later found as best debutants in Poland: Lukasz Barczyk ("I’m Looking at you, Mary"), Artur Urbański ("Belissima"), Iwona Siekierzyńska ("My Fried Chicken"), Wojciech Smarzowski ("The Auricle"). Apple Film has also produced many full-length documentaries, tele-plays and TV series.

Many projects were made in international co-production with producers and television stations in the Czech Republic, Slovakia, Hungary, France, Austria and Germany. Productions were frequently supported by Eurimages and MEDIA Development.

Apple Film Production managers are members of the Polish Film Academy. Dariusz Jablonski is also a member of the European Film Academy.

Film production companies of Poland